DA-108 rap band from Saint Petersburg (Russia) was formed in 1994 by DJ-108 and Cooper. Distinctive feature of band is strong emphasis for flow with frivolous attitude to the content of lyrics (the term was even coined wack style — style of nonsense).

History

Foundation 
Pavel Pachk'ay aka «DJ 108» was born in 1973 in Leningrad. In his children and youth he was engaged in breakdancing. In  January 1990 year Pavel went to study in the US for a month on an exchange program. This time he met and became interested in rap and hip-hop. In 1991 he went to the Institute he met Anton aka Fux was a famous breakdancer in the Saint Petersburg. Then they decided to create a rap band. Fux was a lyric, Pavel made a music. Name DA-108  was appeared into the title after reading the article "Solving a strange number». The guys didn't have any musical equipment and all first records was made in home studio on a tape recorder using the Soviet drum machine "LEL», using samples from southern hip-hop. Was recorded demo album consists of 10 tracks. Album immediately went on hands, it was rewritten in almost all institutions, and some people still have these old records.

In 1992 was purchased "Yamaha" drum machine and "Lomo" microphone and the second album started to record. After some performances Fux left the band in 1993. In summer 1993 DJ 108 met Rasim from Academy-2 band. Thanks to Rasim Pavel starred in the video «Буду погибать молодым» (Budu pogibat molodym / To die young) of Mister Maloy MC.

In 1994 DJ 108 met Roman Alexeev aka Cooper from «S.M.D.» band on the basketball. Cooper became the third member of DA-108. DJ-108 offered Cooper to make track on verse «Московский гуляка» (Moscovsky gulyaka / Moscow reveller) of Sergey Esenin under music of famous hit of Malchishnik band. 8 March 1994 was happened a first performance of this membership in pavilion «Attraction». This date it is considered a birthday of band, although it differs from the actual one by two years.

The band tours around St. Petersburg and Moscow, participating in various festivals and promotions with some songs. Author of all lyrics was a DJ-108 except track «Я хочу сказать» (I want to say) by Cooper. Lyrics of DA-108 strongly influenced by absurdist poetry of Daniil Charms. This style was named wack style — style of nonsense. The flow and music of DA-108 was influenced by oldschool rap bands Ultramagnetic MC's, House of Pain, Naughty By Nature, Das EFX. Signature feature of DA-108 - using quotes from Soviet films.

In 1994 band was invited to the concert «Stop The Violence» by Academy-2 band, organized by Vlad Valov. Later DA-108 performed at the fest Rap Music 1994 where the group took second place, gave away the IFK band. This year was given the first interview for 5TV. In 1995 DJ- 108 bought a computer and recorded by new all main tracks of DA-108. Next year the band took the first place at the Rap Music 1996 Fest.

Da-108 Flava conflict with a Fux 
DA-108 making way for rap in St. Petersburg clubs allows new teams to appear on the stage co-adapting young rappers to DA-108 Flava. In 1994, near the Gorkovskaya metro station, Cooper began selling audio cassettes of rap. DJ Kefir made him radio advertising. Many rappers of St. Petrsburg tightened to Cooper. So was formed unity «DA-108 Flava» aka Горьковская туса (Gorkovskaya Tusa). This creative association included a lot of rap collectives : «X-team», «Адреналин» (Adrenaline), «ЧП», «D-Story», «Невский Бит (Nevsky Beat)», «Зелёный Синдром» (Zeleny sindrom / Green Syndrome), «Ikambi Gwa Gwa», A-Tone and others. In the future, many famous artists came out of this Association, for example, Smoky Mo and Krip-A-Krip.

In November 1996 supporting Vlad Valov was appeared broadcast «Хип-Хоп Инфо» (Hip-Hop Info) on the Radio Record with DJ-108 and Anton Fux as hosts. Thanks to fame of DA-108 Broadcast became popular.

At the same time Fux created new project - Baltic Clan with STDK, Papa Gus and other rappers. This project was affiliated with pirate company «KDK Records». This creative union start to release every month compilations of different artists sometimes not of high quality caused outrage of some Petersburg's rappers.

Once upon a time on the radio broadcasting Fux asked DJ-108 - «Why did you come here?». «What for? To work» - answered Pavel. «The Director fired you» - told Fux. Fux came to the Director. He told Fux came to him and said he could handle it alone and he didn't need a second host. In fact Fux made a raider capture of broadcast and DJ-108 lose their job. After that, no relationship with him became impossible. DA-108 Flava stood in opposition to Baltic Clan. Happened a big split in St. Petersburg hip-hop.

Further times

1998-2003 years 
21 May 1999 debut LP «Дорога на восток» (Doroga na Vostok/Road to the East) was released on the tapes. This is a collection of songs from period from 1992 to 1998. 15 October 1999 album was released on CD by label Zvezda Records. In 2007 album was included in list of main Russian rap albums from 1999 by rap.ru portal.

In 1998 DJ-108 and DJ Tonic created the broadcast «ХОП-инфо» (Hop-info) on the radio «ПОРТ FM» (PORT FM) but it didn't last very long. At the late 1998 DJ-108 opens record label «МАМАПАПА» (Mamapapa / Motherfather) where recorded young mc's and created radio spots.

In 1999 DJ Keet joined to DA-108 collective. 23 August 2000 was released a video by track «Праздник Эй-Тона (Say 26)» (Prazdnik Ey-Tona / A-Tone's holiday) was made in 1999 year. This track was a birthday gift for rapper A-Tone from DA-108 Flava. Despite the small budget and home-made quality, the video hit the chart rotation of MTV Russia in September 2000. 10 September 2000 the band performed on «Adidas Streetball Challenge 2000» fest. In 2000 year Cooper joined to Bad Balance and Bad B. Alliance. In the future, he did not participate in DA-108.

At the end of 2000 DJ-108 relocated in Moscow where works under sound production of Bad B. Alliance artists. From 2001 to 2002 he recorded second album. In 2003 Pavel returned to Saint Petersburg. In 2003 was released a video by track «Все Вместе» (Vse vmeste / All together) feat «Триатлон» (Triatlone) band.

2004-2014 years 
On 6 July 2004 was released the second LP «Комбинатор» (Combinator). LP was full of samples and quotes from soviet films - phrases of the great Combinator Ostap Bender and other cinematic characters as comments and interludes of tracks. Some tracks was created on poems of Sergey Esenin and Daniil Kharms. The material for album has been collected for many years.  

In 2009 DJ-108 was interviewed for a documentary series «Хип-Хоп В России: от 1-го Лица» (Russian hip-hop from the first Person).

2014-2020 years 
Since 2014 to 2019 DJ-108 was a judge of Versus Battle YouTube show including battle Oxxxymiron vs Johnyboy 12 April 2015.

In 2016 album «Дорога на Восток» was remastered on vinyl by label «To Russia with Love».

In 2017 Pavel published video from 1992 year where some famous Russian rappers (DA-108, Bad Balance, Mister Maloy) rapped and danced the one in the underpass.
  
In 2017 DA-108 and «Зелёный Синдром» (Zeleny sindrom / Green Syndrome) band performed the opening act of House Of Pain in SPB.

30 March 2018 was released an album «Питерский олдскул» («St. Petersburg oldschool») including a lot of old unreleased tracks and some new material. This year DJ-108 participated on the solo album «Триумф» (Triumph) of Vasily Vasin from Kirpichi.

In 2019 honor of the twentieth anniversary was remastered on vinyl single «Праздник Эй-Тона» (Say 26). Also DJ-108 gave some interview for some YouTube hip-hop blogs.

On 23 May 2020 Cooper suffocated with carbon monoxide as a result of a fire in his apartment on the eighth floor of a building in the Vyborg district of SPB. Together with the 43-year-old rapper, his 62-year-old mother Lyudmila died. DJ-108 told in interviews for some media about the last years of Cooper's life and discussed his problems with alcohol.

11 June 2020 was released fourth LP «Это все не то» (Чужие 2005-2011) (Eto vse ne to (chuzhie 2005-2001) / It's all wrong (strangers 2005-2011)) consists of old unreleased tracks from 2005 to 2011.

22 June 2020 was released single «Бери шинель» (Beri shinel / Take your greatcoat).

1 July 2020 Bad Balance, DJ-108 and Lojaz released video for track «Высоко на небесах» (Vysoko na nebesah / High in the sky), devoted the memory of Cooper.

Discography

DA-108 
 1999 — «Дорога на Восток» (Doroga na Vostok/Road to the East) 
 2004 — «Комбинатор» (Combinator) 
 2018 — «Питерский олдскул» («St. Petersburg oldschool») https://the-flow.ru/releases/da-108-piterskiy-oldskul
 2020 — «Это все не то» (Чужие 2005-2011) (Eto vse ne to (chuzhie 2005-2001) / It's all wrong (strangers 2005-2011))

DA-108 Flava 

 2000 — «Мама Папа» (Mama Papa / Mother Father)
 2001 — «Первомайский рэп» (Pervomaisky rap / First may rap) 
 2004 — «Однажды в Питере» (Odnajdy v pitere / Once upon a time in St. Petersburg)

DJ-108

Mixtapes 
 1999  —  А Вот Так! (A vot tak! / And Here It Is!). (1999)
 2005  —  А Вот Так! (A vot tak! / And Here It Is!). (remastered) (2005)
 2000  —  Breaking (2000) ft. Dj Keet
 2005  —  Breaking №1 (remastered)  ft. Dj Keet
 2002  —  заМЕШАТЕЛЬство (zaMESHATELstvo / confusion) (2002)
 2004  —  Party Up! (Boombastik Sound) (2004)
 2004  —  The Best Of Hip-Hop 2004 (2004)
 2004  —  Электротовары (Electrotovary / Electric appliances) (Electric Boogie Mix) (2004)
 2004  —  Электротовары 2 (Electrotovary-2 / Electric appliances-2) (Electric Boogie Mix) (2004) ft. Dj Dark
 2004  —  Back To Da Real Hip-Hop Of 90's... (2004)
 2005  —  United Colors Of R`n`B (2005) 2CD ft Dj R-Beat
 2005  —  In Da Club (R`n`B Mix) (2005)
 2006  —  Hip Hop Muzic (Hip-Hop Mix), Dj Dark - Мемуары (Old School Techno Mix) (2006) 2CD
 2006  —  «R’N’B Classic» (DJ 108 & DJ Dollar)
 2006  —  «DJ 108» (MP3)
 2007  —  «Битва при клаустрофобусе» (Bitva pri klaustrofobuse / Battle at cloustrofobous) (DJ 108)
 2007  —  «Hip-Hop 1» (DJ 108 Chart)

No Face Crew 

 1999 — «DJ DJ DJ» (No Face Crew: Тоник (Tonik), Штакет (Shtaket), 108)

Videos 

 2000 - Праздник Эй-Тона (Say 26) (Prazdnik Ey-Tona / A-Tone's holiday)
 2003 - «Все Вместе» (Vse vmeste / All together) feat «Триатлон» (Triatlone)

References

Da-108 
The initial language of this article was Russian.

Musical groups from Saint Petersburg
Russian musical groups
Rappers from Saint Petersburg
Russian hip hop
Russian hip hop groups
Russian hip hop musicians
Musical groups established in 1992